The Tramwaje Szczecińskie (Polish for Szczecin Trams) is a tram transport company of Szczecin, the capital city of West Pomeranian Voivodeship in Poland. It manages the city's tram network. Company was established on 1 January 2009, as a result of transforming previous company, MZK Szczecin.

The company deals with:

 serving tram transport within the borders of city Szczecin.
 leading repairs, maintenance and modernisation of tram vehicles and other devices and equipment.
 managing entrusted property

Tram vehicles

The company currently possesses following types of trams:

Low-floor rolling stock can be found on the lines : 2, 3, 5, 7, 8, 10, 12.

References

Sources 
 official website of Tramwaje Szczecińskie
 http://www.mkm.szczecin.pl/

Transport in Szczecin
Companies based in Szczecin
Polish Limited Liability Companies